{{DISPLAYTITLE:Tau4 Eridani}}

Tau4 Eridani (τ4 Eridani, τ4 Eri) is a binary star system in the constellation Eridanus. It is visible to the naked eye with an apparent visual magnitude of 3.65. The distance to this star can be estimated using the parallax method, which yields a value of roughly 300 light years.

This is an evolved red giant star currently on the asymptotic giant branch with a stellar classification of M3/4 III. It is a slow irregular variable star of type Lb, undergoing changes in magnitude over the range 3.57−3.72 with a periodicity of 23.8 d. At its estimated distance, this yields a physical size of about 106 times the radius of the Sun. It shines with 1,537 times the luminosity of the Sun from an outer atmosphere at an effective temperature of 3,712 K.

This is most likely a binary star system. The companion is a magnitude 9.5 star at an angular separation of 5.7″ along a position angle of 291°, as of 2013.

References

M-type giants
Asymptotic-giant-branch stars
Slow irregular variables
Binary stars
Eridanus (constellation)
Eridani, Tau4
Eridani, 16
020720
015474
1003
Durchmusterung objects